Prinsessan av Cypern (Larsson), an opera by Lars-Erik Larsson
Prinsessan av Cypern (Pacius), an opera by Fredrik Pacius